The Ambassador of the Kingdom of Serbia to the United Kingdom (officially known as the Ambassador of the Kingdom of Serbia accredited to the Court of St James's) was the official representative of the Government of the Kingdom of Serbia to the Government of the United Kingdom of Great Britain and Northern Ireland from 1883 to 1918.

Envoys Extraordinary and Ministers Plenipotentiary of the Kingdom of Serbia accredited to the Court of St. James’s (1883-1918)

References

External links 
 Serbian Embassy in London

Lists of ambassadors to the United Kingdom
United Kingdom
Serbia
Kingdom of Serbia
Serbian diplomats
Serbian people
Diplomacy-related lists
Serbia diplomacy-related lists